The Aetolian (or Aitolian) League was a confederation of tribal communities and cities in ancient Greece centered in Aetolia in central Greece. It was probably established during the early Hellenistic era, in opposition to Macedon and the Achaean League. Two annual meetings were held at Thermika and Panaetolika. The league occupied Delphi from 290 BC and steadily gained territory  until, by the end of the 3rd century BC, it controlled the whole of central Greece with the exception of Attica and Boeotia. At its peak, the league's territory included Locris, Malis, Dolopes, parts of Thessaly, Phocis, and Acarnania. In the latter part of its power, certain Greek city-states joined the Aetolian League such as the Arcadian cities of Mantineia, Tegea, Phigalia and Kydonia on Crete.

During the classical period the Aetolians were not highly regarded by other Greeks, who considered them to be semi-barbaric and reckless. Their League had a complex political and administrative structure, and their armies were easily a match for the other Greek powers. However, during the Hellenistic period, they emerged as a dominant state in central Greece and expanded by the voluntary annexation of several Greek city-states to the League. Still, the Aetolian League had to fight against Macedonia and were driven to an alliance with Rome, which resulted in the final conquest of Greece by the Romans.

History 

The Aetolians were a recognised ethnic group with a religious centre at Thermos from at least the seventh century BC. 
During the Peloponnesian War, the Aetolians were initially neutral, but when the Athenians tried to invade Aetolia in 426 BC, the Aetolians forced them to retreat. In the course of the fourth century, the league offered passive support to more powerful states and was rewarded for it, receiving Aeolis from the Thebans in 367 BC and Naupactus from Philip II of Macedon in 338 BC. Sometime in this century, the Koinon tōn Aitōlōn (League of the Aetolians) was founded, but it is uncertain when. One suggestion is that the league was founded by Epaminondas in 367 BC. Grainger believes that it was founded much later, around the time of the rise of Philip II of Macedon. Archaeology indicates that settlements in Aetolia began to grow in size and complexity over the course of this century.

After the death of Philip II in 336 BC, the Aetolians joined the Thebans in opposing Alexander the Great and the stress of their defeat caused the league to implode. Over the next decade it seems to have been reconstituted and in the later years of Alexander's reign the Aetolians seized Oeniadae against his will. 

In 232 BC, the Illyrians under Agron attacked the Aetolians, and managed to take many prisoners and booty.

The Aetolian League joined the Athenians in the Lamian war against Antipater which broke out after Alexander's death in 323 BC and continued to oppose Macedonian power throughout the Wars of the Diadochi, participating in invasions of Macedon in 320, 316/5 and 313 BC. Around 301 BC, the Aetolians took control of Parnassus, including the panhellenic sanctuary of Delphi, which they would continue to control for over a century. Demetrius Poliorcetes launched the Fifth Sacred War, 289-287 BC, in an attempt to remove them, but was defeated and driven from Macedonia altogether with the help of Pyrrhus of Epirus. A Sixth Sacred War, 281 BC, led by Areus I was rebuffed by the Aetolians alone and in 280 BC, they took control of Heraclea in Trachis, which gave them control over the crucial pass at Thermopylae.

In 279 BC, they were victorious in battle against the Gauls, who had invaded Greece and were threatening the sanctuary of Delphi. After their victory they earned the appreciation of the rest of the Greeks and they were admitted as a new member into the Amphictyonic League.

In 229 BC, the Aetolians participated in a naval battle off the island of Paxos in a coalition with Korkyra and the Achaean League, and were defeated by a coalition of Illyrians  and Acarnanians; as a result, the Korkyreans were forced to accept an Illyrian garrison in their city, which was put under the command of Demetrius of Pharos.

In the Social War, 220-217 BC, the Aetolian League fought against the Kingdom of Macedonia. Philip V of Macedon invaded Aetolia and sacked the city of Thermos as a response to the Aetolians' invasion at the city of Dodona in Epirus.

The league was the first Greek ally of the Roman Republic, siding with the Romans during the First Macedonian War, 215-205 BC, and helping to defeat Philip V of Macedon at the Battle of Cynoscephalae in 197 BC, during the Second Macedonian War. However, it grew increasingly hostile to Roman involvement in Greek affairs and only a few years later sided with Antiochus III, the anti-Roman king of the Seleucid Empire, during the Roman-Syrian War. The defeat of Antiochus in 189 BC robbed the league of its principal foreign ally and made it impossible to stand alone in continued opposition to Rome. The league was forced to sign a peace treaty with Rome that made it a subject ally of the republic. Although it continued to exist in name, the power of the league was broken by the treaty and it never again constituted a significant political or military force.

Administrative system

The league had a federal structure, which could raise armies and conduct foreign policy on a common basis. It also implemented economic standardization, levying taxes, using a common currency and adopting a uniform system of weights and measures. There may not have been any central archive of state documents. However, the constituent communities of the league enjoyed substantial autonomy. At times the league was unable (or unwilling) to prevent its members from undertaking military actions against states that had treaties with it. The league members were grouped together in a number of tele (districts), which seem to have had administrative and juridical powers of some sort. 
 
The league's central administrative apparatus consisted of an assembly, a council, and a number of magistrates. The Ekklesia (Assembly) was open to all citizens of all member communities of the league. The assembly was the ultimate authority within the league, with responsibility for declarations of war and peace, but its power was limited by the infrequency with which it met. Two meetings took place a year, one at the Thermica festival which was held at Thermos on the autumnal equinox and another in spring at the Panaetolica festival which took place at a different site each year. Emergency meetings could also be called.

The exact competencies of the Council, referred to as a boula or synedrion in different documents, relative to the Assembly are not clear. It consisted of delegates elected by each of the constituent communities of the league in proportion to their size. By the late third century BC it had around 1500 members - too large for it to have been in continuous session. A small portion of the council's members, known as the apokletoi ("Select-men"), conducted day-to-day business, such as sending and receiving embassies.

The league's archons (magistrates) were elected by the assembly each year at the Thermica. The chief executive was the strategos (General), who commanded the league's armies, received all diplomatic contacts from other states in first instance, and presided over meetings of the assembly, the council, and the select-men. The office could be held multiple times, but only after an interval of, probably, four years. The  hipparchos (Cavalry Commander), originally a minor post, became the General's deputy from the late 260s BC, but his exact responsibilities are not clear. The third in command was the Grammateus (Secretary). These three officials were Eponymous archons (eponymous magistrates), which is to say that they were named in the dating formula for all decrees of the league. From around 260 BC, there were also seven tamiai (Treasurers) and seven epilektarchoi (Commanders of the Elite), who managed financial and military matters respectively. There were a number of boularchoi (Council Commanders) who seem to have been a steering committee for the Council. When these first appear in the 260s, there were two of them, but by the end of the third century BC they had risen to six or more, presumably as a result of the continued expansion of the league's membership (and thus of the size of the Council).

From 278 the league sent delegates to the Amphictyonic League (Delphic Amphictyony), gradually increasing over time until the league held a majority of the seats on the council, which increasingly became an instrument of Aetolian power projection. From the 260s, the secretary of the Amphictyonic council was always an Aetolian. These delegates seem to have been elected along with the other magistrates at the Thermica, but their relative rank is not clear.

Pirate state?
The Aetolian League acquired a reputation for piracy and brigandage. Though there is some recognition that Polybius was, to an extent, following an Achaean bias in his portrayal of the League, many modern historians have accepted this portrayal as in the main justified. For example, Walbank is explicit in seeing the Aetolians as systematically using piracy to supplement their income because of the meager resources of their region and Will simply assumes the truth of the charge.

Grainger devotes a whole chapter to examining Aetolian involvement in piracy along with the charges that the Aetolians were temple robbers. He finds it hard to credit that Aetolia was involved in piracy since they lacked a fleet of even the most basic sort. Further, by contrast with more general historians, those who have made specific studies of piracy and brigandage barely mention Aetolia. He lists the times that the Aetolians were accused of temple robbery and argues that the weight of the accusations should take into account that they are usually made by political opponents of the League and refer to occasions that were already some way in the past when the accusations were made.

References

Sources
 John D. Grainger (1999) The League of the Aitolians (Google Books).
 C. Michael Hogan, Cydonia, Modern Antiquarian, January 23, 2008 
 Krzysztof Kęciek (2002) "Kynoskefalaj 197 p.n.e" Serie Historic Battles Published in Warsaw by Bellona.
 Joseph B. Scholten (2000) The Politics of Plunder: Aitolians and Their Koinon in the Early Hellenistic Era (Google Books).
 Willis Mason West (1902) Ancient History to the Death of Charlemagne, Allyn and Bacon.

External links

 
Greek city-state federations
Hellenistic Greece
States and territories established in the 4th century BC
Former confederations